The Thirteen is a 1937 Soviet red western action film directed by Mikhail Romm.

Plot
In Soviet Central Asia, ten demobilized Red Army soldiers ride through the desert to the railroad. Three more people are with them: commander of the frontier Zhuravlev and his wife Maria Nikolaevna and an old geologist. In the desert, they find a well and hidden machine guns – this is the base of Basmach Shirmat Khan, whom the Red Army could not neutralize for a whole year. A single soldier is sent out for help while others remain to restrain the Basmachi.

There is almost no water in the well, but the soldiers carefully conceal it from the Basmachi who have approached. The bandits suffer from thirst and attack in an attempt to reach the well. In an unequal battle, nearly all the defenders are killed, but their enemies are captured by the cavalry which has come to the rescue.

Cast 
 Ivan Novoseltsev - Squadron Commander Ivan Zhuravlyov 
 Yelena Kuzmina - Marya Nikolaevna Zhuravlyova 
 Aleksandr Chistyakov - Aleksandr Petrovich Postnikov, geologist 
 Andrei Fajt - Sub-Colonel Skuratov 
 Ivan Kuznetsov - Soldier Yusuf Akchurin
 Alexei Dolinin as Aleksey Timoshkin - Red Army soldier (as A. Dolinin)
 Pyotr Masokha as Petr Sviridenko - Red Army soldier (as P. Masokha)
 Pavel Yudin as Petrov - Red Army soldier (as P. Yudin)
 Dmitry Zolts] as Dimiriy Levkoyev - Red Army soldier (as D. Zolts)
 Viktor Kulakov as Nikolay Balandin - Red Army soldier (as V. Kulakov)

Influence
The 1943 American film Sahara, directed by Zoltan Korda and starring Humphrey Bogart, and its 1995 remake have significant plot similarities. In fact, in the film's opening credits for the screenplay and adaptation, the 1943 film credits the Soviet photoplay for inspiration.

References

External links 

Films directed by Mikhail Romm
1930s war adventure films
Soviet war adventure films
Films set in Central Asia
Soviet black-and-white films